Miremont is a commune in the Haute-Garonne department in southwestern France.

Geography
The commune is bordered by seven other communes: Vernet to the north, Grépiac across the river Ariège to the northeast, Auterive to the east, Lagrâce-Dieu to the south, Auribail to the southwest, Beaumont-sur-Lèze to the west, and finally by Lagardelle-sur-Lèze to the northwest.

The river Ariège flows through the commune, forming a border with Grépiac.

Population

See also
Communes of the Haute-Garonne department

References

Communes of Haute-Garonne

oc:Miramont de Comenge